Johnny "Jack" McKenna (born 10 March 1942) is an Irish former professional darts player who played in British Darts Organisation (BDO) and Professional Darts Corporation (PDC) tournaments.

Darts career
McKenna reached the quarter-finals of the inaugural Winmau World Masters in 1974. In 1989, he reached the final of the WDF World Cup, losing to Eric Bristow.

It was at the 1990 BDO World Darts Championship where McKenna become notorious within the game, as the man on the receiving end of the first nine-dart finish at the World Championship, achieved by Paul Lim of the United States. McKenna had earlier beaten Peter Evison in the first round before losing to Lim in the second round.

He returned to television in the 2002 PDC World Grand Prix, beating Cliff Lazarenko in the first round before losing to Phil Taylor. He returned to the event in 2004, but lost in the first round to Dennis Priestley.

McKenna tried to qualify for the 2008 BDO World Championship but lost in the very first round.

World Championship results

BDO
 1990: Last 16: (lost to Paul Lim 2–3)

Notes

External links
Profile and stats on Darts Database

Living people
Irish darts players
1942 births
Place of birth missing (living people)
British Darts Organisation players
Professional Darts Corporation associate players
Sportspeople from County Kildare